
Gmina Domaszowice is a rural gmina (administrative district) in Namysłów County, Opole Voivodeship, in south-western Poland.

Villages
Gmina Domaszowice contains the villages and settlements of Domaszowice, Dziedzice, Gręboszów, Kopalina, Nowa Wieś, Piekło, Polkowskie, Siemysłów, Stary Gręboszów, Strzelce, Sułoszów, Świbne, Szerzyna, Wielka Kolonia, Wielołęka, Włochy, Woskowice Górne, Wygoda, Zalesie and Zofijówka.

Neighbouring gminas
Gmina Domaszowice is bordered by the gminas of Namysłów, Pokój, Rychtal, Świerczów and Wołczyn.

References

Domaszowice
Namysłów County